Jonny Maudling (born Jonathan Maudling) is an English composer, keyboard player and former drummer for the band Bal-Sagoth, keyboardist with the band Kull, former bassist with the unsigned UK thrash band Igniter, and frequent collaborator with the band My Dying Bride. Maudling's primary instruments are Roland synthesizers when playing live. He comes from a musical family and was classically trained on piano from an early age. He has contributed to three My Dying Bride studio albums, provided session orchestration on material by Sermon of Hypocrisy, and played guest keyboards on a full-length release by the Ukrainian metal band Semargl. He composed music for the video game Adellion. Currently Maudling is a producer and engineer, operating his own recording studio called Waylands Forge Studios in Yorkshire, England.

Although he composes music mostly in the symphonic metal/black metal genres, Maudling's main influences include mostly non-metal bands such as The Police, Tangerine Dream, Queen, Pat Metheny, as well as classical composers such as Wagner, Stravinsky, Tchaikovsky, Messiaen and Holst.

Early days

Maudling was born in Kent  and grew up in Sheffield, Yorkshire. In Kent, Maudling's parents lived opposite a music store. The store owner, Terry Bradford, who ended up representing Britain on the TV show A Song For Europe in the 1970s, was a friend of Maudling's father and received free records, most of which were classical, contemporary music and Jazz. Jonny grew up listening to these records, educating himself in a wide variety of musical styles. He had private piano instruction, working through the Royal Academy of Music grade system under Elizabeth Hydes.

At school in South Yorkshire, he learnt to play guitar and bass guitar. He played in various bands in his teen years, performing gigs in pubs and nightclubs around the area. He started song writing at this time. He bought his first synthesizer in the mid 1980s with the money he earned working on Saturdays. After completing school, Maudling tried out for music college, but was considered a borderline candidate with substandard sight-reading ability. He opted instead to concentrate on band work.

Bands
In the late 1980s and early 1990s Maudling played bass, sang and composed songs for a thrash metal outfit called Igniter. This band recorded two demos and performed gigs around England, the most high profile of which was a support slot with prominent thrash metal outfit Xentrix

Through Alistair MacLatchy, a former bandmate in Systematic Insanity with prominent extreme metal drummer Nicholas Barker, Maudling was introduced to vocalist/lyricist Byron Roberts in 1993. For several years, Roberts had been looking for talented musicians with whom to launch his symphonic black metal band Bal-Sagoth, but had been unable to meet anyone willing to commit to the project. As a result of MacLatchy's introductions, Jonny, his brother Chris and Byron began working together in a band environment.

This new outfit went loosely under the provisional name of "Dusk" for several months, as MacLatchy did not like the name Bal-Sagoth, nor the symphonic black metal direction which Roberts had suggested.
Because of creative and musical differences in direction and style, the band soon parted ways with MacLatchy. With the introduction of keyboards, the band found their focus. Roberts had the creative team he had long sought to execute his conceptual vision. For Maudling, this represented an opportunity for creative musical freedom. Roberts, an English post-grad with an interest in 20th century pulp sci-fi writers, could finally implement the ideas he had had for years. The formal inception of Bal-Sagoth occurred during the summer of 1993.

On the strength of their demo which they recorded during December 1993, the band were signed by Cacophonous Records, a then small subsidiary of Vinyl Solution based in London. Later, they would sign to Nuclear Blast for three albums, recording a total of six albums to date.

Maudling composes the music for Bal-Sagoth, sometimes incorporating ideas from his brother, guitarist Chris. He played drums on the first three albums and during subsequent tours, using a session keyboard player, but in 1999 Maudling opted to concentrate full-time on keyboards, handing drum duties off to Dave Mackintosh (DragonForce).

Maudling also played keyboards on the My Dying Bride albums The Light at the End of the World and The Dreadful Hours, and composed and recorded all the music for the My Dying Bride release Evinta, based on the existing compositions as originally written by Andrew Craighan, Hamish Glencross, et al. He has also contributed keyboard session work to bands including Semargl and Sermon of Hypocrisy.

In February 2013, Maudling helmed Kull, a new project in the symphonic metal sphere.

In October 2017 it was announced that Maudling had provided orchestration for the new Elvenking album Secrets Of The Magick Grimoire.

Maudling orchestrated and played keyboards on Elvenkings 2019 album Divination.
 
On 24 May 2019 the debut album of Maudling's new musical project "Kull" was released by the Swedish independent label Black Lion Records.

In 2023, Maudling played keyboards on the Keep Of Kalessin album "Katharsis".

Keyboard equipment 
Maudling has used various keyboards and synthesizers over the years including Casio CZ-1000, Yamaha Dx21, Korg M1, Roland XP-50 and Roland Fantom X7, Korg Kronos X.

References

External links
 Wayland's Forge Studio official site
 Jonny Maudling facebook page
 KULL  
 Bal-Sagoth official site
 My Dying Bride official site

English audio engineers
English heavy metal keyboardists
English heavy metal drummers
Living people
Black metal musicians
Bal-Sagoth members
Year of birth missing (living people)